List of notable alumni and faculty, people who attended and graduated from Albion College in Albion, Michigan, and people who received honorary degrees.

Alumni

Academia
Ella H. Brockway Avann, 1871, educator (1853-1899)
Robert Bartlett, surgeon (1939-)
Bob Bemer, 1940, computer scientist ) (1920-2004)
Bruce C. Berndt, 1961, mathematician (1939-)
J Harlen Bretz, 1906, geologist (1882-1981)
Mark W. Chase, 1973, botanist (1951-)
Harriet Gertrude Eddy, 1890s, educator and librarian (1876-1966)
Britt Halvorson, professor, writer, anthropologists.
Robert E. Horton, 1897, hydrology (1875-1945)
Melvin H. Knisely, 1927, anatomist specializing in microcirculation (1904-1975)
Forest Ray Moulton, 1894, astronomer (1872-1952)
John W. Porter, 1953, former president of Eastern Michigan University; first African-American State Superintendent since Reconstruction
Dwight B. Waldo, first president of Western Michigan University (1864-1939)

Arts and entertainment
Philip Campbell Curtis, 1930, surrealist-inspired painter (1907-2000)
Allie Luse Dick, music teacher
Cornelia Moore Chillson Moots, 1882, missionary, temperance evangelist (1843-1929)
Jon Scieszka, 1976, children's book author (1954-)
John Sinclair, poet and '60s counterculture icon (1941-)
F. Dudleigh Vernor, 1914, organist, composer

Business
William C. Ferguson, 1952, chairman of NYNEX NKA Verizon Communications (1930-2015)
Steve Grigorian, President and CEO, Detroit Economic Club
Joel Manby, 1981, former CEO of SeaWorld Entertainment
Geoffery Merszei, CFO of Dow Chemical Company (1951-)
Martin Nesbitt, 1985, businessman, Barack Obama friend and campaign treasurer (1962-)
Doug Parker, 1984, chairman and chief executive officer of American Airlines (1962-)
Moose Scheib, founder and CEO of LoanMod.com (1980-)
Richard Mills Smith, 1968, chairman and editor-in-chief, Newsweek (1946-)
Paul "Skip" Ungrodt, 1952, former chairman and president of Ideation, Inc.

Government and politics
Florence Riddick Boys, 1896, Indiana suffragist, journalist, state official
Prentiss M. Brown, 1911, U.S. Senator from Michigan
David L. Camp, 1975, U.S. Representative from Michigan
Barbara Ann Crancer, 1960, Missouri state circuit court judge and daughter of former Teamsters Union president Jimmy Hoffa
Homer Folks, 1887, a pioneer of mental and public health reform in New York
Bates Gill, Chinese foreign policy expert and director of Stockholm International Peace Research Institute
Matthew Gillard, politician, member of the Michigan House of Representatives
George Heartwell, 1971, mayor of Grand Rapids, Michigan
Matt Heinz, politician, member of Arizona House of Representatives
Charles Tisdale Howard, 1880, Speaker of the South Dakota House of Representatives
Thomas Ludington, 1976, judge of the United States District Court for the Eastern District of Michigan and Albion College trustee
Lyle H. Miller, 1914, brigadier general in the Marine Corps
Arnold R. Pinkney, 1952, campaign manager for Jesse Jackson 1984 Democratic presidential nomination
Carl W. Riddick, member of the U.S. House of Representatives from the Second District of Montana
Mark Schauer, 1984, U.S. Representative from Michigan
Anna Howard Shaw, attended 1872–1875, civil rights leader, first female Methodist minister in the U.S.
Robert M. Teeter, 1961, Republican pollster
Edwin B. Winans, attended in 1840s, U.S. Representative and Governor of Michigan
Jacob M. Collini, 2008, Chief Assistant to the Prosecuting Attorney for Roscommon County & graduate of the John James McCoy School of Law
Robert C. Sisson, 1982, Commissioner, International Joint Commission

Other
 Josh A. Cassada, 1995, physicist, NASA astronaut
 Chris Greenwood, 2012, former National Football League player for Detroit Lions
 Phyllis Harrison-Ross, 1956, psychiatrist working with developmentally disabled and mentally ill children
 Mary Beecher Longyear, philanthropist and founder of Longyear Foundation
 J. Fred “Pop” McKale, 1910, former University of Arizona basketball coach; 1998 Albion Hall of Fame inductee
 Leonard F. "Fritz" Shurmur, 1956, former college and National Football League football coach
 Hazen Graff Werner, 1920, bishop of the United Methodist Church
 Cedric Dempsey, 1954, former president of the National Collegiate Athletic Association (NCAA)

Honorary degrees 
 Barbara Bush, 2005, former First Lady of the United States

Presidents of Albion College

Mathew B. Johnson (2020-2021)
Mauri A. Ditzler (2014-2020)
Donna M. Randall (2007–2013)
Peter T. Mitchell (1997–2007)
Melvin L. Vulgamore (1983–1997)
Bernard T. Lomas (1970–1983)
Louis W. Norris (1960–1970)
William W. Whitehouse (1945–1960)
John Lawrence Seaton (1924–1945)
John Wesley Laird (1921–1924)
Samuel F. Dickie (1901–1921)
John Ashley (1898–1901)
Lewis R. Fiske (1877–1898)
William B. Silber (1870–1871)
J.L.G. McKown (1869–1870)
George Beiners Jocelyn (1864–1869 and 1871–1877)
Thomas H. Sinex (1854–1864)
Ira Mayhew (1853–1864)
Clark T. Hinman (1846–1853)
Rev. Charles Franklin Stockwell (1843–1845)

Notes: William C. Ferguson served as interim president for six months in 1997. 
Dr. Michael L. Frandsen served as interim president for the 2013–2014 academic year.

Athletics
See List of Albion Britons head football coaches
 Dustin Beurer, 2005, head football coach for Albion
Morley Fraser, head football coach
Walter S. Kennedy, head football coach and all-American quarterback at for the University of Chicago Maroons
Dale R. Sprankle, head football coach at Albion and also at Adrian College

References 

Lists of people by university or college in Michigan